The Canadian Theological Society (CTS) is a learned society founded in 1955 to promote the study of theology. The society is a  member of the Canadian Corporation for Studies in Religion (CCSR) and the Canadian Federation for the Humanities and Social Sciences (CFHSS).

As a member of the CCSR, the Canadian Theological Society sponsors Studies in Religion/Sciences Religieuses, a bilingual journal that addresses a wide range of topics in religious studies and theology. It also supports and contributes to the book series published by the CCSR.

The society meets annually at the Canadian Congress of Humanities and Social Sciences, which is sponsored by the CFHSS.

Presidents 

 1955–1957: James S. Thomson
 1957–1958: Eugene Fairweather
 1958–1959: David Hay
 1959–1960: Alistair McKinnon
 1960–1961: Russell Aldwinckle
 1961–1962: David Hay
 1962–1963: William Fennell
 1963–1964: Joseph McLelland
 1964–1965: Eric Jay
 1965–1966: George Johnston
 1966–1967: Gregory Baum
 1967–1968: Ronald Reeve
 1968–1969: John Hoffman
 1969–1970: David Demson
 1970–1971: Walter Principe
 1971–1972: Kenneth Hamilton
 1972–1973: Martin Rumscheidt
 1973–1974: David Lochhead
 1974–1975: Frederick Crowe
 1975–1976: Arne Siirala
 1976–1977: Dale Stover
 1977–1978: Charles Paris
 1978–1979: Norman King
 1979–1980: Wilfred Cantwell Smith
 1980–1981: Joanne McWilliam Dewart
 1981–1982: Kenneth Hamilton
 1982–1983: Donald Evans
 1983–1984: Mac Watts
 1984–1985: Donna Geernaert
 1985–1986: Abrahim Khan
 1986–1987: Elizabeth Bellefontaine
 1987–1988: Ray Whitehead
 1988–1989: James Horne
 1989–1990: Ellen Leonard
 1990–1991: Jay Newman
 1991–1992: Pamela Dickey Young
 1992–1993: James Olthuis
 1993–1994: Peter Slater
 1994–1995: Doris Dyke
 1995–1996: Mary Schaefer
 1996–1997: Marilyn Legge
 1997–1998: Harold Wells
 1998–1999: George Schner
 1999–2000: Anne Marie Dalton
 2000–2001: Douglas Harink
 2001–2002: Cynthia Crysdale
 2002–2003: Eric Beresford
 2003–2004: Brenda Appleby
 2004–2005: Don Schweitzer
 2005–2006: Heather Eaton
 2006–2007: John Franklin
 2007–2008: Loraine MacKenzie Shepherd
 2008–2009: Michael Bourgeois
 2009–2010: Alyda Faber
 2010–2011: Lee Cormie
 2011–2012: Kathleen Skerrett
 2012–2013: Doris Kieser
 2013–2014: Allen Jorgenson
 2014–2015: Robert Fennell
 2015–2016: Cristina Vanin
 2016–2017: Jeremy Bergen
 2017–2018: Timothy Harvie
 2018–2019: Catherine MacLean
 2019–2021: William Sweet
 2021–2022: Jane Barter
 2022–2023: Darren Dias

See also 
 Canadian Society for the Study of Religion
 Society of Biblical Literature

References

External links 
 

1955 establishments in Canada
Learned societies of Canada
Organizations established in 1955
Theological societies